Exo-α-sialidase (EC 3.2.1.18, sialidase, neuraminidase; systematic name acetylneuraminyl hydrolase) is a glycoside hydrolase that cleaves the glycosidic linkages of neuraminic acids:

 Hydrolysis of α-(2→3)-, α-(2→6)-, α-(2→8)- glycosidic linkages of terminal sialic acid residues in oligosaccharides, glycoproteins, glycolipids, colominic acid and synthetic substrates

Neuraminidase enzymes are a large family, found in a range of organisms. The best-known neuraminidase is the viral neuraminidase, a drug target for the prevention of the spread of influenza infection. The viral neuraminidases are frequently used as antigenic determinants found on the surface of the influenza virus. Some variants of the influenza neuraminidase confer more virulence to the virus than others. Other homologues are found in mammalian cells, which have a range of functions. At least four mammalian sialidase homologues have been described in the human genome (see NEU1, NEU2, NEU3, NEU4).
Sialidases may act as pathogenic factors in microbial infections.

Reaction 
There are two major classes of Neuraminidase that cleave exo or endo poly-sialic acids:
 Exo hydrolysis of α-(2→3)-, α-(2→6)-, α-(2→8)-glycosidic linkages of terminal sialic acid residues
 Endo hydrolysis of (2→8)-α-sialosyl linkages in oligo- or poly(sialic) acids (see  endo-α-sialidase.)

Function 
Sialidases, also called neuraminidases, catalyze the hydrolysis of terminal sialic acid residues from the newly formed virions and from the host cell receptors. Sialidase activities include assistance in the mobility of virus particles through the respiratory tract mucus and in the elution of virion progeny from the infected cell.

Subtypes 
Swiss-Prot lists 137 types of neuraminidase from various species as of October 18, 2006. Nine subtypes of influenza neuraminidase are known; many occur only in various species of duck and chicken. Subtypes N1 and N2 have been positively linked to epidemics in humans, and strains with N3 or N7 subtypes have been identified in a number of isolated deaths.

CAZy defines a total of 85 glycosyl hydrolase families, of which families GH34 (viral), GH33 (cellular organisms), GH58 (viral and bacterial), GH83 (viral) are major families that contain this enzyme. GH58 is the only endo-acting family.

The following is a list of major classes of neuraminidase enzymes:
 Viral neuraminidase
 Bacterial neuraminidase
 Mammalian neuraminidases:

Structure 

Influenza neuraminidase is a mushroom-shaped projection on the surface of the influenza virus. It has a head consisting of four co-planar and roughly spherical subunits, and a hydrophobic region that is embedded within the interior of the virus' membrane. It comprises a single polypeptide chain that is oriented in the opposite direction to the hemagglutinin antigen. The composition of the polypeptide is a single chain of six conserved polar amino acids, followed by hydrophilic, variable amino acids. β-Sheets predominate as the secondary level of protein conformation.

The structure of trans-sialidase includes a catalytic β-propeller domain, a N-terminal lectin-like domain and an irregular beta-stranded domain inserted into the catalytic domain.

Recent emergence of oseltamivir and zanamivir resistant human influenza A(H1N1) H274Y has emphasized the need for suitable expression systems to obtain large quantities of highly pure and stable, recombinant neuraminidase through two separate artificial tetramerization domains that facilitate the formation of catalytically active neuraminidase homotetramers from yeast and Staphylothermus marinus, which allow for secretion of FLAG-tagged proteins and further purification.

Mechanism 

The enzymatic mechanism of influenza virus sialidase has been studied by Taylor et al., shown in Figure 1. The enzyme catalysis process has four steps. The first step involves the distortion of the α-sialoside from a 2C5 chair conformation (the lowest-energy form in solution) to a pseudoboat conformation when the sialoside binds to the sialidase. The second step leads to an oxocarbocation intermediate, the sialosyl cation. The third step is the formation of Neu5Ac initially as the α-anomer, and then mutarotation and release as the more thermodynamically stable β-Neu5Ac.

Inhibitors 

Neuraminidase inhibitors are useful for combating influenza infection: zanamivir, administered by inhalation; oseltamivir, administered orally; peramivir administered parenterally, that is through intravenous or intramuscular injection; and laninamivir which is in phase III clinical trials.

There are two major proteins on the surface of influenza virus particles. One is the lectin haemagglutinin protein with three relatively shallow sialic acid-binding sites and the other is enzyme sialidase with the active site in a pocket. Because of the relative deep active site in which low-molecular-weight inhibitors can make multiple favorable interactions and approachable methods of designing transition-state analogues in the hydrolysis of sialosides, the sialidase becomes more attractive anti-influenza drug target than the haemagglutinin. After the X-ray crystal structures of several influenza virus sialidases were available, the structure-based inhibitor design was applied to discover potent inhibitors of this enzyme.

The unsaturated sialic acid (N-acetylneuraminic acid [Neu5ac]) derivative 2-deoxy-2, 3-didehydro-D-N-acetylneuraminic acid (Neu5Ac2en), a sialosyl cation transition-state (Figure 2) analogue, is believed the most potent inhibitor core template. Structurally modified Neu5Ac2en derivatives may give more effective inhibitors.

Many Neu5Ac2en-based compounds have been synthesized and tested for their influenza virus sialidase inhibitory potential. For example:
The 4-substituted Neu5Ac2en derivatives (Figure 3), 4-amino-Neu5Ac2en (Compound 1), which showed two orders of magnitude better inhibition of influenza virus sialidase than Neu5Ac2en5 and 4-guanidino-Neu5Ac2en (Compound 2), known as Zanamivir, which is now marketed for treatment of influenza virus as a drug, have been designed by von Itzstein and coworkers. A series of amide-linked C9 modified Neu5Ac2en have been reported by Megesh and colleagues as NEU1 inhibitors.

See also 
 Glycoside hydrolase family 33
 Neuraminidase inhibitors
 Hemagglutinin (influenza)

References

External links

 
 Orthomyxoviruses, Robert B. Couch, UTMB.  Article includes a good clear line drawing of a neuraminidase on an influenza virus.

Carbohydrate chemistry
EC 3.2.1
Glycobiology
Neuraminidase inhibitors